Driscoll may refer to:

 Driscoll (surname), people with the surname Driscoll
 Driscoll, North Dakota, United States
 Driscoll, Texas, United States
 Driscoll Independent School District, in Driscoll, Texas, United States
 Driscoll Catholic High School, in Addison, Illinois, United States
 Driscoll's Block, a historic block in Springfield, Massachusetts, United States
 Driscoll Expressway, a proposed highway in New Jersey, United States
 Driscoll Bridge, a toll bridge in New Jersey carrying the Garden State Parkway

See also
 Driscoll's, a producer and distributor of fresh berries
 Driskill